Andree Camille Bonifacio (born December 13, 2002), known professionally as AC Bonifacio, is a Canadian dancer, singer, vlogger and actress of Filipino descent known for being the first ever grand champion of Filipino TV dance competition Dance Kids along with Lucky Ancheta In 2016. The duo was called "Lucky Aces." Before winning the said competition, the duo was featured on The Ellen DeGeneres Show and had a chance to meet and perform with American popstar Ariana Grande on Grande's show in Vancouver, British Columbia in 2015. Bonifacio also competed on the Kids edition of Philippine TV Show Your Face Sounds Familiar (season 1) where she finished as 3rd placer. She also made her acting debut on Wansapanataym Presents: The Amazing Ving in which she played "Mika".

Personal life 
Bonifacio was born and raised in Vancouver, British Columbia, Canada. AC went to Queensborough Middle School in New Westminster, British Columbia. She is a Hall of Famer in Los Angeles, California.

Career

2013–2015: Lucky Aces and Ellen DeGeneres Show Guesting 
Bonifacio, along with Lucky Ancheta, formed the dancing tandem Lucky Aces in 2012 and started making YouTube videos. They also competed in various local and international dance contests. They became popular when their YouTube videos went viral on Vine. In 2015, they were invited to perform on The Ellen DeGeneres Show and were given chance to perform with Ariana Grande at Grande's Vancouver, British Columbia show in April 2015.

2016–present: Dance Kids and Your Face Sounds Familiar 
In November 2015, Lucky Aces joined ABS-CBN's reality dance competition show Dance Kids. The show ended on February 7, 2016, announcing Lucky Aces as the grand winner, the duo received two million pesos in cash, a house and lot, a family vacation, three hundred thousand pesos worth of shopping spree, and a management contract from Star Magic.

In 2017, Bonifacio participated as one of the performer contestant on  ABS-CBN's singing and impersonation competition Your Face Sounds Familiar: Kids, the dancer won two times in the competition, for her impersonations of Rnb singer Usher and Pop singer Janet Jackson. She chose her idol Sarah Geronimo to emulate on the show's grand showdown and performed Sarah Geronimo's 2014 hit Kilometro. The performance later landed as #2 on YouTube Philippines trends.

She is now currently working and uploading on her YouTube channel "Andree Bonifacio" every Wednesday at 7:00 pm. She has over 500,000 subscribers and has received her Silver Play Button.

Bonifacio applied to join the Global pop group Now United as a member to represent the Philippines, but would not make the final cut. She would later cameo in Now United's music video for "Afraid of Letting Go", which was shot in Intramuros.

In 2019, Bonifacio became one of the hosts of World of Dance Philippines' online show, which is also hosted by Riva Quenery and Maymay Entrata.

Filmography

Television/Digital

Discography

Singles 
 Sumayaw, Sumaya (2018)
 Touch and Move (2018)
 Get Me (2018)
 Slide into my DM (2019)
 In and Out (with Lavaado, 2019)
 Fool No Mo! (2021)

See also
 List of dancers

Notes

References

External links 
 

2002 births
Actresses from Vancouver
Citizens of the Philippines through descent
Filipino female dancers
Filipino television actresses
21st-century Filipino women singers
Living people
Musicians from Vancouver
Participants in Philippine reality television series
Reality dancing competition contestants
Canadian musicians of Filipino descent
Star Magic
ABS-CBN personalities
Members of Iglesia ni Cristo